Steve Beren (born September 9, 1951) is an American political activist from Seattle, Washington.

Early life and education
Born in New York City, Beren says that he was raised in a nominal Jewish home, later became an atheist and, in 1995, a Christian.

Political activism

Socialist Workers Party
Until 1990 Beren was a member of the Socialist Workers Party (SWP),

While living in Detroit in the 1970s, Beren was questioned by the FBI who were investigating his roommate at the time, a Young Socialist Alliance partisan suspected of subversive activities. According to a congressional report of that incident, the roommate had previously been harassed by a "person claiming to be a congressman on the House Internal Security committee" who had insinuated knowledge of an "undisclosed purpose" behind the roommate and Beren's relocation from New York; the purported congressman claimed the move was done at the behest of the SWP for purposes of infiltration and agitprop.

Beren left the SWP in 1990 due to, what he described as, "exhaustion with it."

Democratic Party
After leaving the SWP, Beren became a member of the Democratic Party, where he remained for the next fourteen years.

Republican Party

Beren quit the Democratic Party to become a Republican. He is a self-identified "Tea Party activist" and was an early confederate of Tea Party founder Keli Carender. The success of Carender's first event, a 2009 rally in Seattle against the American Recovery and Reinvestment Act of 2009, has been partly attributed to promotion it received on Beren's blog. Beren went on to organize and speak at other Tea Party rallies.

Beren has said that Republicans should "have bold colors, wave the Republican flag boldly; wave fiscal conservatism, social conservatism, immigration conservatism — boldly." During the 2012 GOP presidential primaries, Beren endorsed Newt Gingrich. He has called for fortifying the U.S.' southern border with Mexico and was a supporter of the 2003 Iraq War.

In 2006, and again in 2008, Beren ran for U.S. House of Representatives from Washington's 7th congressional district, advancing to the general election on the Republican ticket in the heavily Democratic-leaning district. In both races he was soundly defeated by incumbent Jim McDermott, scoring roughly 16-percent of the vote each time while being thoroughly outspent by his rival (McDermott spent $1 million during the 2008 election, compared to $32,850 invested by Beren's campaign). In 2010 he again ran for congress from Washington's 7th congressional district, that time as a declared write-in candidate.

As of 2014, Beren is the New Media and Technology Director for the Washington State Republican Party.

Personal information
Beren has lived in Seattle since 1987, and is married.

Strat-o-Matic Baseball
Beren was very active in the Strat-o-Matic Baseball community in the late 1990s and 2000s.  From 1993 to 2009, he was a member of ESSOM, including a long stint as ESSOM Spring League commissioner.  He won the ESSOM Spring League championship in 1995 with the Oregon Outlaws, and the 2001-02 ESSOM Fall League championship with the Nashville Wildcats.  He was a member of the Great American Baseball League from 1998 to 2007, compiling a 664-956 (.410) record with the Florida Rockets.

References

External links 
Steve Beren's official campaign site

1951 births
Living people
Washington (state) Republicans
Converts to Protestantism from atheism or agnosticism
Activists from Seattle
Tea Party movement activists